Deltebre is a municipality in the comarca of the Baix Ebre in Catalonia, Spain. It was created in 1977 when the communities of Jesús i Maria and la Cava seceded from the municipality of Tortosa. The municipality occupies much of the northern half of the Ebre Delta, on the left bank of the river. The cultivation of rice and tourism are the major industries. The T-340 road links the municipality with Tortosa and the rest of the comarca, while barges cross the river to Sant Jaume d'Enveja.

Twin towns
 Reinosa, Spain

References

 Panareda Clopés, Josep Maria; Rios Calvet, Jaume; Rabella Vives, Josep Maria (1989). Guia de Catalunya, Barcelona: Caixa de Catalunya.  (Spanish).  (Catalan).

External links 

Official website 
 The municipality and tourism board
 Government data pages 

Municipalities in Baix Ebre
Populated places in Baix Ebre